Johnny Moore may refer to:

Johnny Moore (basketball) (born 1958), basketball player
Johnny Moore (baseball) (1902–1991), American baseball player
Johnny Moore (singer) (1934–1998), American soul singer and songwriter, played with The Drifters
Johnny Moore (trumpeter) (1938–2008), founding member of The Skatalites
Johnny Moore (1906–1969), group leader and guitarist with Johnny Moore's Three Blazers
Johnny B. Moore (born 1950), Chicago electric blues guitarist and singer
Johnny Moore (soccer) (born 1947), former Scottish-U.S. soccer player

See also
Rev. Johnnie Moore, Jr.
John Moore (disambiguation)